Marinia was the name of a number of tugs.

ST Marinia, the former Empire Aid
ST Marinia, the former Empire Mary.
ST Marinia, a 392 GRT tug built in 1955.

References

Ship names